Sekondi Hasaacas FC is a Ghanaian professional association football club based in Sekondi-Takoradi. The club won the Ghana Premier League in 1977 and is currently participating in the Division One League following relegation from the 2015-16 Ghana Premier League.

The side is the most followed football club in the Western Region, a region with a population of almost four million, and is nicknamed Hasmal, which comes with the response 'We Go Doo'.

History

The club was formed in 1931 and was previously a member of the Ghana Telecom Premier League. After twenty years in the Globacom Premier League, the club was relegated to the Poly Tank Division One League in 2010.

Affectionately referred to as the 'Giants of the West', an accolade it acquired after being the only Ghanaian team to hold Fortuna Düsseldorf to a 3–3 draw during a tour of West Africa by the German side in August 1959. The team had been the Oil City's only participant in the top flight Ghanaian Premiership for over a decade from the mid 1996–97 football season until its relegation to Division One in the 2009–2010 league season.

The club, Sekondi Hasaacas, has a rich history, producing four captains for the senior national team (the Black Stars) and contributing as many as five players to the squad that won the 1982 African Cup of Nations in Tripoli, Libya.

The supporters group of Sekondi Hasaacas FC are known as Councils. They number in the hundreds of thousands across the region and keenly follow the progress of the club at all levels. The club has a mid-profile but a reputation for killing giants. Hence it has admirers and sympathizers country-wide; indeed, many football fans have made Sekondi Hasaacas their second club of choice to support.

Early years 
The foundation of Sekondi Hasaacas Football was due to six railway workers. The name Hasaacas came from the railway workers in Sekondi-Takoradi who decided to use the first letters of their names to form the name of the club in 1931, thus H.A.S.A.A.C.A.S.—namely Hammond, Amua Sakyi, Adotei, Allotey, Cann, Adotey and Sackey.

Most of them were supporters of Accra Hearts of Oak but migrated to Sekondi-Takoradi mainly because of their railway work. Amoah Sakyi was a High Court judge and was named as the club board secretary. Cann was also a lawyer by profession.

The name later became Sekondi Hasaacas because the team was based in Sekondi; they decided to use rainbow colors as their original colors because most of the founding members were supporters of Accra Hearts of Oak. After some years, they decided to change the colors because they clashed with the jerseys of Accra Hearts of Oak, who first started using rainbow colors. Hasaacas then decided to use white, green and red as its new colors.

Sekondi Hasaacas brand  
Sekondi Hasaacas Football Club in June 2003 added to its file an academy and, for the first time in history, a ladies' team, the Hasaacas Ladies Football Club.

The academy was divided by age into division for under-12, -14 and -17 years, to help nurture young talents.

Later in 2009, the talented group of under-17 players was promoted to the Malavands Football Club, the reserve side of the mainstream Hasaacas Football Club to participate in the Division Three League.

The Malavands team qualified that same year to play in the Division Two league for the 2010 season, and have proved to be formidable in the 2nd division.

Thus, HASMAL represents the total Secondi Hasaacas family, the mainstream team, the ladies' team, Malavands and the Hasaacas Academy.

Daniel Egyin served as club captain in the 2016 Ghanaian Premier League season.

Emblem 
The bright green, white and red flag of the club and the ball-headed giant logo is very appealing to the large bands of fans and supporters of the club.

Honours

National titles

Ghana Premier League: 1
 1977
FA Cup: 1
 1985
Ghana Super Cup: 1
 1985

Other GFA national titles
SWAG Cup: 2
 1982-83, 1983-84
Ghana Telecom Gala: 1
 1988

International titles
WAFU Cup 1 
 Champion – 1981-82
 Runners-up – 1982-83
African Cup Winners Cup: 0
 Runners-up – 1980-81

Head coaches

  Herbert Addo (1982–1985)

  P.S.K. Paha (1985–1986)
 Emmanuel Quarshie (2001–2002)
  Kobina Amissah (2013 –2014)
 Benjamin Hayford (28 February 2020 – )
 Joseph Agyemang (23 August 2017 – )
 Yusif Basigi (1 November 2014 – 4 August 2016)

Players

Current squad
As of 27 April 2018 Note: Flags indicate national team as defined under FIFA eligibility rules. Players may hold more than one non-FIFA nationality.

Notable players 

 Daniel Egyin served as club captain in 2016 Ghanaian Premier League season.

References

External links
 

 
Football clubs in Ghana
Association football clubs established in 1931
Sekondi-Takoradi
1931 establishments in Gold Coast (British colony)